Geneseo is a city in Henry County, Illinois, United States. As of the 2020 census, the population was 6,539. Geneseo is 20 miles east of the Quad Cities, at the intersection of Interstate 80, U.S. Route 6 and Illinois Route 82.

History
Geneseo was founded as a Christian colony in 1836 by seven families of the Congregationalist denomination from Geneseo, New York and Bergen, New York seeking to establish a "church in the wilderness". Roderick R. Stewart, one of the city's founding members, named the town Geneseo after the settlers' town of origin in New York. The name "Geneseo" is a variation of the Iroquois word Genesee, meaning "shining valley" or "beautiful valley".

Journey
Planning for the colony began as early as 1829. In May 1836 the founding seven families of Geneseo sent an exploratory committee to survey the precise location of their new community in the Old Northwest.  This group, known as the "New York Committee", or "New York Group" was composed of John C. Ward, Lukas T. Seyller, and Roderick R. Stewart. Advised at a meeting in Chicago by the future Governor of Illinois, Thomas Ford,  the small committee rode by wagon and horseback to investigate the 2,000-acre tract. The transaction of the land was completed at a place called Brandenburg's Tavern in what is today Colona Township and purchased at a dollar and a quarter per acre.

On September 17, 1836, the settlers embarked on their treacherous journey from Geneseo, New York and Genesee County, New York across Canada, down through Michigan, then across Indiana and Illinois. Their journey was marred with difficulties; only traveling 7 miles in 6 days through much of Canada and Michigan.  Near Ypsilanti, Michigan the seven families split into two with two families, the Messrs. Ward and Manville, remaining behind to rejoin the journey in the spring.  Despite the hardships, and in the true Puritan fashion, the settlers insisted on resting on the Sabbath. Unfortunately, their struggles with nature continued. The winter was so bad that the families remained in Princeton, Illinois and what was known as Providence County while their structures were being established. Cromwell K. Bartlett constructed the first structure just south of the town in the winter of 1836, and Elisha Cone and J.C. Ward built the first cabin and frame house in town, respectively, in 1837.

Establishment of the city

The town was split into lots by the trustees: John C. Ward, Cromwell K. Bartlett, and R.R. Stewart. They split the land into five blocks east to west and three blocks north to south with locations for a cemetery, a block for the school and church, a public square, and the "gospel lot," which, in 1846, became a seminary. Lots would be drawn by chance, assuming that the settlers would build on them, and immediately the town established its Christian and education-focused philosophy. A mandatory tithe on all proceeds (over a certain amount) were set aside to build a religious and educational seminary in the center of town, now the Geneseo City Park. This building, originally known as the Geneseo Manual Labor High School, was later renamed the Geneseo Seminary and was borne of the self-denial philosophy of the town's leaders. However, due to considerable debt, the Geneseo Seminary ended up closing in the year 1857 and was folded into the public school system as Geneseo Central School.

Further proving their religious and educational convictions, when many of the town's founding families hadn't arrived and while the remainder battled frostbite, the settlers began a temperance society in 1836 with several families in Hanna Township and Cleveland, Illinois. Construction on the original First Congregationalist Church began in 1837 and its first communion was held on April 18, 1838 during a large hail storm that destroyed nearly all windows in the small town. Its first regular pastor was Rev. Jairus Wilcox. The Congregationalist Church was so important in Geneseo's early founding that Ms. Ella Hume Taylor wrote on the centennial anniversary of Geneseo's founding in 1936, "The history of Geneseo Colony and of the Congregational Church are so closely interwoven that, for many, to speak of one, meant the other also, for their interests were so in common. The church was a Court of Justice, settling community and family misunderstandings. At one time in the early days every adult but one, and most of the children, were members of this church, and for over eighteen years there was no other church affiliation in Geneseo, not until after the railroad went through, bringing in those of other denominations, also bringing some foreigners of different beliefs."

These strong religious beliefs also strongly influenced the town's political leanings as well, being very strong abolitionists and Republicans. Ella Hume Taylor further wrote that, "scarcely had the colonists erected their cabins before Geneseo became a station of the Underground Railroad for the poor runaway slaves soon learned where friends were. Deacon Cone's cabin...was one place, for it had an attic for a hiding place. There were other places also, for those helping them had regular stations, and at night, or under grain or hay, by daylight some of the young men would get them on to the next station, and toward a land of safety.'" It was also discovered in 1999 that the structure of the Geneseo Historical Society was, too, used as a "stop" on the Underground Railroad.Even before the church was constructed, the first school was established when R.R. Stewart's daughter, Miss Susannah Stewart, began teaching classes in a one-room school house in 1837. It was built with puncheon floors, round poles, and the old wagon covers they used to make the journey.

Expansion

The Chicago, Rock Island, and Pacific Railroad, also known as the Rock Island Line, was surveyed in 1850 to run from Chicago to Rock Island with a prominent stop in Geneseo. The line was completed in June 1854 and, immediately thereafter, the Grand Excursion promotional voyage that took prominent politicians and well-off citizens on a voyage to and down the Mississippi, stopped in the small town. Although Geneseo had grown at a near stand-still since its inception, reaching only 500 persons by 1850, it soon exploded to 5,500 just 11 years later (within the 10-square mile area). As a testament to the power of the railroad, it was quoted by an editor of the Rock Islander, who visited Geneseo, that there were "one hundred new buildings erected in Geneseo" in 1854 alone and "seventy [more] built in the present year [1855]." Due to its large growth, Geneseo officially became a town in 1855, by an act of the Illinois State Legislature, and a city in 1865. Like many towns that experienced a growth spurt in the middle of the 19th century, Geneseo's wealthier families constructed many of their homes in accordance with Victorian Architecture and a large number of them remain today, giving credence to the name "Victorian Geneseo."

Simultaneously with the expansion of the town, Geneseo's first newspaper, the Geneseo Democratic Standard, started in August 1855 by James Bowie. It collapsed not a year and a half later. In June 1856, I.S. Hyatt founded the Geneseo Republic and began publishing in a building on Main Street. Although founded as a Republican Party newspaper, it is no longer affiliated with any political party. It is still in operation and remains the only Geneseo-only newspaper.

Geneseo Central School, the first high school in Geneseo, was built in 1856 and became coalesced with Geneseo Seminary in 1857. It was used until 1866 when the North Side Building, a four-room brick school house, was constructed where North Side Elementary School is today. It was expanded in 1871 and was demolished in 1970. South Side School, constructed by John W. Ross in 1889 on the corner of College Avenue and Second Street, became the official high school for Geneseo in 1890.

In 1883, two higher-education institutions were established in Geneseo, both conferring bachelor's and master's degrees: the Geneseo Collegiate Institute (GCI) and the Northwestern Normal School (NNS). GCI, a Presbyterian academy that once held 350 students, was on State and Main and included present day Atkinson Hall, which housed a small religious high school for a time. Although a large expansion was planned for GCI in the early 1900s, the school financially collapsed in 1922 and was razed in 1930. The Northwestern Normal School, a secular college which reached a total of 400 students, was in the Park Villa neighborhood near present-day Hammond Henry Hospital. It, too, collapsed financially and in 1901 John C. Hammond purchased NNS' old dormitory and presented it to the City of Geneseo to establish Hammond Henry Hospital on November 28, 1901.

20th century 
SchoolsIn 1909 the Township High School District was established and a new high school was needed for the growing town. It received a major expansion in 1932. Officially known as Township High School, it was erected between 1910 and 1911 on North Street next to the First Congregationalist Church and the Geneseo City Park. The old South Side School was then used as an additional grade school for K-8 students until the new junior high was built on Ogden Ave in 1954. South Side was then used as an administrative building until the 1960s when it was demolished to make room for a new district unit office. In the 1960s, Geneseo High School switched places with Geneseo Junior High and became J.D. Darnall Senior High School (until reverting to Geneseo High School in 2005). The old "Township High School" was then used as Geneseo Junior High School until the 1990s when Geneseo Middle School was built next door to J.D. Darnall on Ogden Avenue. Township High was subsequently demolished for additional space for the city park. Today, Geneseo Community Unit School District 228 is the school district responsible for providing public education for children in the city. Today, Southwest Elementary, Northside Elementary, Millikin Elementary, and St. Malachy School provide the K-5 education in Geneseo.

Climate

Notability
 The Maple Leafs have won 4 state championships in football, with 6 second-place state finishes, 54-consecutive winning seasons, and more than 40 consecutive playoff appearances—an Illinois state record. The Geneseo High School Music Department has been very successful, too, with 6 State Championships, 10 State runner-up finishes, and 6 third place finishes in music.
Downtown Geneseo will be a stop on the Chicago to Des Moines Amtrak expansion.

Geneseo contains 13 active churches of different denominations throughout the city.

This town is also home to gun manufacturing company Springfield Armory, Inc..

Geneseo is well known for its popular annual community events, including the Geneseo Music Festival on Father's Day weekend, and the renowned Geneseo Christmas Walk, formerly known as the Geneseo Victorian Walk, which is held on the second Saturday of December.

Parks and recreation
 Two golf courses: Sugar Maple Golf Course, Geneseo Country Club, and Indian Creek Mini-Golf
 Geneseo Campground featuring 63 campsites and 4 cabins
Six parks
 Geneseo Prairie Park - a 1-square mile, natural park along the Hennepin Canal
 Richmond Hill Park - a 2-square mile park featuring playgrounds, softball diamonds, tennis courts, soccer fields, a theater, disc golf, and rolling hills along Geneseo Creek near Interstate 80
 J.F. Edwards and Bollen Field Complex - a 1-square mile park of baseball diamonds in southwest Geneseo along US Highway 6
 Geneseo City Park - a 3-acre, park in the center of town featuring a hundred maple trees, a band shell, a one-acre open community space, and playgrounds.
 G.E. Hulting Park - an athletic park featuring a running track, football field, tennis courts, and open space next to the Geneseo Community Center on North St
 The  Hennepin Canal Parkway State Park, which runs through five counties, passes through northern Geneseo.
 John and Carla Edwards Aquatic Center: a $5.6 million public pool complex featuring climbing walls, pool house, diving boards, lap pool, and children's play zone.
 A downtown movie theater.
 The Geneseo Historical Museum.
 A newly constructed public library on Chicago St
 A community center featuring: weight rooms, racquetball, saunas, meeting rooms, running tracks, and basketball courts.
 Two public swimming pools (indoor and outdoor).
 Skydiving

Politics
The city government is organized under a aldermanic form. The mayor is elected at large for a two-year term. The Mayor, Sean Johnson, serves as Chief Executive Officer and also Presiding Officer over the City Council of Geneseo. The City Council consists of eight aldermen representing four individual wards.  (Ward 1, Craig Arnold and Paula Simosky - Ward 2, Bob James and James Roodhouse - Ward 3, Keith Kennett and Martin Rothschild - Ward 4, Brett Barnhart and Douglas Crow.

School District
Geneseo's School District is Dist. 228. 
The schools are :
Geneseo High School
Geneseo Middle School
Millikin Elementary School
Northside Elementary School
Southwest Elementary School

Demographics

As of the census of 2010, there were 6,586 people, 2,740 households, and 1,810 families residing in the city. The racial makeup of the city was 96.7% White, 1.0% African American, 0.06% Native American, 0.8% Asian, 0% Pacific Islander, 0.28% from other races, and 0.8% from two or more races. Hispanic or Latino of any race were 0% of the population.

There were 2,707 households, out of which 30.0% had children under the age of 18 living with them, 56.3% were married couples living together, 7.6% had a female householder with no husband present, and 33.1% were non-families. 30.7% of all households were made up of individuals, and 18.7% had someone living alone who was 65 years of age or older. The average household size was 2.34 and the average family size was 2.94.

In the city, the population was spread out, with 21.9% under the age of 18, 6.0% from 18 to 24, 25.4% from 25 to 44, 23.0% from 45 to 64, and 24.8% who were 65 years of age or older. The median age was 41 years. For every 100 females, there were 89.4 males. For every 100 females age 18 and over, there were 84.0 males.

The median income for a household in the city was $61,971 and the median income for a family was $51.  The per capita income for the city was $33,152. Male median income was $44,530 and the median female income was $21,070. About 3.3% of families and 8.1% of the population were below the poverty line, including 4.3% of those under age 18 and 6.7% of those age 65 or over.

Geography 

Notable people 

 Linda Bergendahl-Pauling, co-founder of Make-A-Wish Foundation
 Earnest Elmo Calkins, advertising executive
 Agnes Meyer Driscoll, cryptanalyst
 William O. "Doc" Farber, noted American Political Scientist
 Judith Ford, Miss America, 1969
 Edith Dunham Foster, educational filmmaker
 Barry Pearson, NFL wide receiver for the Pittsburgh Steelers and Kansas City Chiefs
 Leon Alaric Shafer, painter and illustrator
 Todd Sieben, Illinois State Senator
 Jack Wanner, MLB shortstop for the New York Highlanders

References

External links 
Geneseo Official website

Cities in Illinois
Cities in Henry County, Illinois
Populated places established in 1836
1836 establishments in Illinois